47th Street station may refer to:

In Chicago
47th station (CTA Green Line), in the Grand Boulevard community area
47th station (CTA Red Line), in the Fuller Park neighborhood
47th Street (Kenwood) station, a commuter rail station on the Metra Electric Line

In New York City
 47th Street station (IRT Third Avenue Line)
 47th–50th Streets–Rockefeller Center station; serving the  trains

Elsewhere
47th Street station (San Diego Trolley)

See also
47th Street (disambiguation)